The Lakland Hollowbody is a dual-pickup, hollow-body electric bass guitar made by Chicago-based Lakland Musical Instruments and designed in conjunction with luthier Michael Tobias.

Available in a U.S.-made model as well as mid-priced Skyline series models built originally in South Korea and later in Indonesia, the 34-inch scale bass is constructed of carved mahogany for the back and sides and of maple for the top and neck. The fingerboard is made of  rosewood.  Current models are equipped with two of Lakland's Chi-Sonic pickups. The body of the bass is completely hollow with no supporting center block.

See also 
 Lakland Musical Instruments

References

External links 
 Lakland Company Website

Guitars